Île-Perrot  station is a commuter rail station operated by Exo in L'Île-Perrot, Quebec, Canada. It is served by  the Vaudreuil–Hudson line.

 on weekdays, 9 of 11 inbound trains and 11 of 12 outbound trains on the line call at this station; one train each way is short turned and one inbound train skips the stop. On weekends, all trains (four on Saturday and three on Sunday in each direction) call here. 

The station is located on Boulevard Perrot. Unusually, the station's two side platforms do not face each other but are located some 80 metres apart on either side of the Boulevard Perrot level crossing. The platforms are also unusually short, to the extent that passengers can only disembark from the rear two cars of their train. There is no station building, and only the inbound platform is equipped with a single shelter.

Bus connections

CIT La Presqu'Île

References

External links
 Île-Perrot Commuter Train Station Information (RTM)
 Île-Perrot Commuter Train Station Schedule (RTM)

Exo commuter rail stations
Railway stations in Montérégie
Rail transport in Vaudreuil-Soulanges Regional County Municipality